William Dudgeon may refer to:

William Dudgeon (poet) (–1813), Scottish poet
William Dudgeon (philosopher), British philosophical writer
William Dudgeon, co-founder of J & W Dudgeon